Sydney-Belmore was an electoral district for the Legislative Assembly in the Australian state of New South Wales from 1894 to 1904. It was named after Earl Belmore who was Governor of New South Wales from 1868 until 1872.

Members for Sydney-Belmore

History
Multi-member constituencies were abolished in the 1893 redistribution, resulting in the creation of 76 new districts, including Sydney-Belmore. Sydney-Belmore consisted of a northern part of the four member district of South Sydney. It was in northern Surry Hills bounded by Liverpool Street, and Oxford Street in the north, Riley Street in the east, Foveaux Street in the south and Elizabeth Street in the west. In 1904, its name was changed to Belmore.

Election results

References

Former electoral districts of New South Wales
Constituencies established in 1894
1894 establishments in Australia
Constituencies disestablished in 1904
1904 disestablishments in Australia